Jere Bergius (born 4 April 1987 in Vesilahti) is a retired Finnish pole vaulter. He competed in the pole vault event at the 2012 Summer Olympics.

Competition record

†: No mark in the final.

References

1987 births
Living people
Finnish male pole vaulters
Olympic athletes of Finland
Athletes (track and field) at the 2012 Summer Olympics
People from Vesilahti
Sportspeople from Pirkanmaa